Khanomabad (also Romanized as Khānomābād) is a village in Miyan Darband Rural District, in the Central District of Kermanshah County, Kermanshah Province, Iran. At the 2006 census, its population was 604, in 140 families.

References 

Populated places in Kermanshah County